A wye station is a station located at a railway wye or junction, and may refer to:

England
Wye railway station, in Kent, England
Redbrook on Wye railway station, a former station in Gloucestershire, England
Ross-on-Wye railway station, a former station in Herefordshire, England
Ross-on-Wye weather station, an automated weather station in Herefordshire, England
Whitney-on-Wye railway station, a former station in Herefordshire, England
RAF Wye, a temporary First World War Royal Air Force training airfield in Kent, England

Wales
Glasbury-on-Wye railway station, a former station in Powys, Wales
Hay-on-Wye railway station, a former station in Powys, Wales
Newbridge on Wye railway station, a former station in Powys, Wales

See also
Triangle station (disambiguation)